The fifth season of RuPaul's Drag Race began airing on January 28, 2013, with a 90-minute premiere episode. The winner of season five headlined Logo's Drag Race Tour featuring Absolut Vodka, won a one-of-a-kind trip, a lifetime supply of Colorevolution Cosmetics, and a cash prize of $100,000.
Santino Rice and Michelle Visage were back as judges at the panel. 

The theme song playing during the runway every episode is "I Bring the Beat", while the song playing during the credits is "The Beginning". Both songs are from RuPaul's album Glamazon.

This is the first-ever series in the show's history to feature a double elimination or a double sashay between two contestants, Honey Mahogany and Vivienne Pinay. It is also the first series to feature a queen, Coco Montrese, lip-sync for their life four times and send 3 people home. This is also the first series where RuPaul allowed fans to vote for a winner.

The winner of the fifth season of RuPaul's Drag Race was Jinkx Monsoon, with Alaska and Roxxxy Andrews being the runners-up, and Ivy Winters being crowned season 5's Miss Congeniality by fans.

Contestants 

Ages, names, and cities stated are at time of filming.

Notes:

Contestant progress

Lip syncs
Legend:

Guest judges 
Listed in chronological order:

Camille Grammer, television personality
Mike Ruiz, photographer
Kristen Johnston, actress
Juliette Lewis, actress and singer
Coco Austin, model
Paulina Porizkova, model and actress
Chaz Bono, writer and activist
Travis Wall, dancer
Julie Brown, actress-comedian
Downtown Julie Brown, actress and MTV VJ
La Toya Jackson, singer
The Pointer Sisters (Anita and Ruth), girl group
Leslie Jordan, actor
Jeffrey Moran, Absolut Vodka marketing/branding executive
Aubrey O’Day, singer
Joan Van Ark, actress
María Conchita Alonso, singer/songwriter and actress
Jamie-Lynn Sigler, actress and singer
Clinton Kelly, fashion stylist
George Kotsiopoulos, editor and fashion consultant
Marg Helgenberger, actress
Bob Mackie, fashion designer

Special guests
Guests who appeared in episodes, but did not judge on the main stage:

Episode 4:
Nick Lazzarini, dancer and winner of So You Think You Can Dance Season 1

Episode 5:
Ian Drew, Entertainment Director of Us Weekly
Episode 6:
 Lucian Piane, composer and record producer

Episode 7:
Deven Green, comedian and musician
Nadya Ginsberg, comedian, actress, and writer
Bruce Vilanch, writer and actor

Episode 9:
Wilmer Valderrama, actor

Episode 11:

Davina Foxx, drag queen expert
Kiera Grice, Mountain Dew Rep

Episode 12:
Gloria Allred, lawyer
Mathu Andersen, make-up artist and photographer
Candis Cayne, actress and performance artist
Episode 13:
 Latrice Royale, contestant on season 4 and All Stars 1
 Willam, contestant on season 4
 Sharon Needles. winner of season 4
Episode 14:
 Latrice Royale, contestant on season 4 and All Stars 1

Episodes

Reception 
The overnight ratings for the fifth-season premiere of Rupaul's Drag Race reinforced the show's position as Logo's juggernaut. "Monday night's 9PM season five premiere of RuPaul's Drag Race worked the ratings runway, averaging a .8 rating in the P18-49 demo. This number represents a 33% increase over Logo's previous top-rated season premiere (fourth-season premiere of RuPaul's Drag Race) and clocks in as the highest-rated season premiere in Logo history.

Additionally, the 90-minute premiere tallied 565,000 total viewers tuning in to meet the new cast of 14 drag queen hopefuls who will fight it out to be crowned "America's Next Drag Superstar". The fifth-season premiere night of RuPaul's Drag Race and companion series RuPaul's Drag Race: Untucked delivered over 1.3 million viewers.

Furthermore, RuPaul's Drag Race: Untucked was the most-watched premiere ever averaging 291,000 total viewers and a .5 rating P18-49. On social media platforms for premiere night, RuPaul's Drag Race and Untucked showed a 136% increase in social activity versus the fourth-season premiere – this includes tweets, Facebook posts and Get Glue check-ins.

See also 

 List of Rusicals

References

External links 
  (U.S.)
 Official website (Canada)
 Official Facebook page

2013 American television seasons
RuPaul's Drag Race seasons
2013 in LGBT history